Berenkuil, Dutch for "bear pit", may refer to:
Berenkuil (traffic), a type of traffic circle with a separate ring for bicycles
Berenkuil, Eindhoven, a traffic circle in Eindhoven, Netherlands

See also
Bear pit (disambiguation)